Hussain Hassan Naeem (19 March 1987 – 13 June 2007) was Lebanese footballer who played as a forward. He was killed by a car bomb, alongside other victims, in an assassination attempt on Lebanese politician Walid Eido.

Career 
Naeem joined the Nejmeh youth team on 2 November 2001, playing for the first team from 2006 until his death in 2007.

Death 
On 13 June 2007, Naeem died from the same car bomb which killed politician Walid Eido and teammate Hussein Dokmak outside the Rafic El-Hariri Stadium.

References 

Lebanese footballers
1987 births
2007 deaths
Association football forwards
Lebanese Premier League players
Nejmeh SC players
Deaths by car bomb in Lebanon
Male murder victims